Mati Karmin (born 26 February 1959 in Tartu) is one of Estonia's most renowned contemporary sculptors. His career as an artist is characterised by an intense and remarkably versatile activity.
Like many of his contemporaries, the representatives of so-called 1980s generation in the Estonian art, Karmin received professional training in the Estonian Academy of Art, which was thorough, yet traditional, not to say conservative according to the international criteria. During his studies, Estonian sculpture was predominantly figurative and employed traditional materials like stone and bronze.

Karmin, on the other hand, has been creating almost all his independent work in a rapidly charging art scene, which is characterised by the denial of traditions, the disputation of values, and blurring of borders between the art forms as well as art and its surrounding space. The notion of sculpture itself has undergone an especially radical transformation. Karmin has reacted to the changing situation perhaps in more dynamic, yet also controversial manner than the majority of Estonian artists. Vibrant creativity, with a very professional plastic thinking and perfect material perception at its heart, has allowed him to act as a traditionalist as well an innovator, achieving outstanding results in both areas.

Besides traditional materials, primarily bronze, Karmin has taken inspiration from unconventional solutions and employed innovative materials right from the beginning of his career. Early on, he caught attention with one of his first exhibited sculptures, “Military Fox” (1981), cleverly formed of corroded scrap metal details. Scrap metal has frequently emerged as an important material and source of inspiration also in the later work of Karmin. Up to mid-1990s, he used scrap metal basically within the borders of the traditional notion of sculpture. By that we think of figures and decorative forms that communicate with space, like the conventional free sculpture, and that are meant to be placed on a platform. Having previously only tentatively touched the borders of the classical notion of sculpture, Karmin in 1994 surprised the public with an epochal conceptual installation “My Father”, taking as the material the career and extensive collection of weeds of his father who was an agricultural researcher. Within the same period falls also the display of impressive construction site cabins of corroded metal on the green area in front of The Tallinn Art Hall Gallery during the group exhibition of innovative sculptors.

One of the most grandiose manifestations of the exploring line of Karmin's work is the underwater mine furniture project that began five years ago. On the northern coast of Estonia - especially the islands - there were numerous heaps of corroded mine shells, which are basically spheres with holes, spires and shackles. Karmin got inspired by these mines and started to collect them. The ambiguity of large scale corroded mine shells intrigued the artist. The shape of the mine is perfect and uniform, while still clearly bearing the stamp of its initial destructive function. Being marked by its belonging to the past, it is closely connected to the complicated recent history that Karmin has always been fascinated with.

Karmin's entire work has relied on various contradictions. He entered the Estonian sculpture scene as an innovator and the continuity of that trait in his creative biography persists, however the notion of classical sculpture and the classical material for sculpture – bronze – is still very important to him and he has time and again returned to it whether in free sculpture or monumental sculpture.

Mine furniture, despite its unprecedented novelty, brings together the two directions in the artist's work. It can be clearly sensed how the artist has enjoyed playing with materials and forms, having developed both its meanings and looks, creating a versatile series, based on contradictions and contrasts.

Karmin uses mines as modules. The entire furniture series is composed of only two existing basic forms of mines – the hemisphere and the cylinder. He has created utility articles of diverse forms, resulting in armchairs, writing desks, beds, toilets, cupboards, bathtubs, swings, fireplaces, and more. He has added to the scrap metal hand-treated copper details, metal mesh, leather upholstery and granite and glass surfaces, thus consciously increasing the semantic contradiction of objects.

At the end of the mine project, the artist created a mobile sculpture out of a Soviet military truck. His vehicle has instead of a rocket a gigantic phallus of mine shells towering above, with four clocks at its top, showing time in four geographic places of the world – Moscow, London, Paris and New York.

Works
1984 monument of the cloth factory, Kärdla
1989 monument of the first national song festival, Tartu
1989 monument to Charles Leroux, Tallinn
1991 bust of Oscar Brackmann, Pärnu
1995 MS Estonia memorial, Tahkuna
1995 bust of Alfred Neuland, Valga
1996 panorama of the Tallinn crematory
1996 monument to Hugo Treffner, Tartus
1997 bust of Andres Saal, Tori
1997 MS Estonia memorial, Pärnu
1998 fountain "Kissing Students", Tartu
1998 monument to Carl Robert Jakobson, Viljandi
1998 Estonian War of Independence. War of Independence memorial at Ropka cemetery, Tartu
2001 monument to Jaan Tõnisson, Tartu
2003 equestrian statue of Saint George, Tori
2006 monument to Michael Park, Tallinn
2007 monument to Juri Lotman, Tartu
2008 Bronze pig, Tartu
2010 monument to Marie Under, Tallinn
2022 monument to Jaak Joala, Viljandi

References

External links
Personal web site

1959 births
Estonian sculptors
Living people
People from Tartu
Recipients of the Order of the White Star, 4th Class